Hang Seng Global Composite Index (HSGCI) is one of the Hong Kong stock market indexes produced by the Hang Seng Indexes Company Limited. HSGCI was launched on 5 September 2011. It serves as an index that reflects the overall performance of all companies (including foreign companies) listed on the Stock Exchange of Hong Kong ("HKEX").

Coverage
HSGCI is calculated on the price movement of listed securities in HKEX consists of:

 all securities that have their primary listing on the Main Board of the HKEX; and 
 the securities / depositary receipts which have been classified as foreign companies and listed on HKEX.

Foreign companies refer to companies which are incorporated overseas, i.e. outside Hong Kong and mainland China, and have a majority of their business overseas.

Constituents
Securities which are either constituents of Hang Seng Composite Index or Hang Seng Foreign Companies Composite Index will be selected as constituents of the Hang Seng Global Composite Index.

See also
Hang Seng Index
Hang Seng Composite Index

References

External links
Official website

Hong Kong stock market indices
Hang Seng Bank stock market indices